John Knox (c. 1510–1572) was a Scottish minister, theologian, and writer.

John Knox may also refer to:

Law
John H. Knox first United Nations special rapporteur on human rights and the environment
John C. Knox (Pennsylvania judge) (1817–1880), lawyer and state judge
John C. Knox (New York judge) (1881–1966), United States federal judge
John Frush Knox (1907–1997), law clerk to U.S. Supreme Court Justice James Clark McReynolds

Military
John Knox (British Army officer) (died 1778), served in North America between 1757 and 1760 and notable for the journals he kept during this period
John Simpson Knox (1828–1897), Scottish soldier and VC recipient
John J. Knox, U.S. Army major during the American Civil War

Politics
John Knox (mayor), Lord Mayor of Dublin 1685–1686
John Knox (1728–1775), member of the Parliament of Ireland for Donegal 1761–68 and Castlebar 1768–74
John Knox (1740–1791), member of the Parliament of Ireland for Dungannon 1769–76
John Knox (1758–1800), member of the Parliament of Ireland for Killybegs 1777–83 and Dungannon 1790–94
John Henry Knox (1788–1872), member of the UK Parliament for Newry
James Knox (British politician) (John James Knox, 1790–1856), member of the UK Parliament for Dungannon
John T. Knox (1924–2017), American politician and lawyer

Sports
John Knox (rugby union) (1880–1964), Scotland rugby union player
John Knox (cricketer) (1904–1966), Argentine cricketer
John Knox (footballer) (born 1941), Australian rules footballer
John Knox (baseball) (born 1948), American baseball infielder
Johnny Knox (born 1986), American football player

Others
John Knox (rebel minister) (active 17th c) a non-conforming Scottish minister who founded the John Knox Church and was exiled as a slave to New Jersey
John Knox (philanthropist) (1720–1790), Scottish bookseller and philanthropist
John Knox (artist) (1778–1845), Scottish landscape painter who painted a depiction of the Nelson Monument, Glasgow
John Jay Knox Jr. (1828–1892), American financier
John Leonard Knox (1925–2015), British High Court judge
John Knox (chemist) (1928–2018), professor of physical chemistry
John Knox (meteorologist) (fl. 1980s–2010s), American meteorologist and mathematician, found new method of calculating the mathematical constant 
John H. Knox (fl. 1980s–2010s), United Nations special rapporteur
John Knox, a character from Lantana

See also
Jon Knox, American session musician drummer, producer and composer